Moshe E. Ben-Akiva (born 1944) is an Israeli-American engineer currently the Edmund K. Turner Professor of Civil and Environmental Engineering at Massachusetts Institute of Technology and has been awarded honorary degrees by University of the Aegean, Royal Institute of Technology, University of Antwerp and Université Lumière Lyon. His research is centered on transportation demand.

References

1944 births
Living people
MIT School of Engineering faculty
21st-century American engineers
Israeli engineers
MIT School of Engineering alumni